Richard The Lionheart is a 2013 film, starring Greg Maness as Richard the Lionheart, Malcolm McDowell as King Henry II and Andrea Zirio as Henry the Young.

Synopsis
While the war threatens with France, King Henry II decides to evaluate the courage of his son Richard the Lionheart, his possible successor. To do this, the King decided to place him into a mysterious castle, where Richard will have to face several trials.

Cast
Greg Maness as Richard the Lionheart
Malcolm McDowell as King Henry II
Stewart Arnold as Selector
Veronica Calilli as Celtic Goddess
Maurizio Corigliano as Barbarian
Davide Ferricchio as Forgotten
Sharon Fryer as Celtic Goddess (voice)
Christopher Jones as One Eye
Alice Lussiana Parente as Girl
Burton Perez as Basileus
Umberto Procopio as Caesar
Thomas Tinker as Philippe
Carrion Yudith as Ghaliya
Andrea Zirio as Henry the Young

Production
The film was directed by Stefano Milla and stars Greg Maness, Burton Anthony Perez, and Malcolm McDowell. According to the generic film, Richard the Lionheart was shot in different places : the fortress of Exilles, built in the 12th century, Casaforte di Chianocco, built in the 12th century (Italy). Some interiors are reconstituted in a Californian studio.

See also
 Cultural depictions of Henry II of England
 Cultural depictions of Henry the Young King
 Cultural depictions of Richard I of England

References
Citations

Bibliography

DUMONT, Hervé, Moyen Âge et Renaissance au cinéma. L'Angleterre (partie I), Paris, BoD, 2017, p. 77.

External links

2013 films
English-language Italian films
Italian adventure drama films
Henry II of England
Cultural depictions of Richard I of England
Henry the Young King
2010s adventure drama films
Films set in the 12th century
American adventure drama films
2013 drama films
2010s English-language films
2010s American films